On October 9, 2007 the city of Saint John, New Brunswick held a plebiscite on a proposal regarding how its Common Council would be composed in the future. The question asked:

"Do you want the City to be divided into four wards of approximately equal population with two councillors to be elected by the voters in that ward, and two councillors to be elected at large?"

The plebiscite approved the proposal.

Unofficial results

Source: Elections New Brunswick

Results requirements

The results of the plebiscite were to be binding if greater than 60% of the voters approved the proposed mixed ward system. Any result of less than a 60% majority would not have been binding, and would have permitted the Common Council to decide how to proceed.

Voting dates

Election day
Tuesday, October 9, 2007

Advance polls
Saturday, September 29, 2007
Monday, October 1, 2007

Advance polls at returning office
Tuesday, October 2, 2007
Wednesday, October 3, 2007
Thursday, October 4, 2007

References

2007 elections in Canada
Referendums in New Brunswick
2007 referendums
2007 in New Brunswick
Politics of Saint John, New Brunswick